Barbara Ann Burtness is an American internist and oncologist. She is a Professor of Medicine at Yale University and co-director of the Stand Up to Cancer Fanconi Anemia Research Fund-Farrah Fawcett Foundation Head and Neck Cancer Research Team.

Early life and education
Burtness completed her Bachelor of Arts degree at Bryn Mawr College in 1982 before enrolling at Stony Brook University for her medical degree. Upon graduating in 1986, she finished her internship and residency at Yale New Haven Hospital and her fellowship at the Memorial Sloan Kettering Cancer Center.

Career
After completing her fellowship in 1993, Burtness became a cancer researcher at Yale University. In this role, she became a member of the Eastern Cooperative Oncology Group, a consortium of researchers who test new treatments in clinical trials. Burtness remained at Yale until 2008 when she became the Chief of head and neck oncology at the Fox Chase Cancer Center. During her tenure at the institution, Burtness was named one of the Best Women’s Physicians for 2011 and listed as one of the Best Doctors in America in 2013.

Burtness left the Fox Chase Cancer Center in 2014 to return to Yale University as a Professor of Medicine and their Clinical Research Program Leader of the Head and Neck Cancers Program. In this role, she was nominated for the 2018 Women Who Conquer Cancer Mentorship Award and again named to the Best Doctors List. During this time, she also served on various committees and councils including the Executive Committee on the Status of Women in Medicine, Faculty Advisory Council, and the Dean’s Climate Working Group.  In 2020, Burtness received the YCC Clinical Science Research Award in recognition of her study "Pembrolizumab alone or with chemotherapy versus cetuximab with chemotherapy for recurrent or metastatic squamous cell carcinoma of the head and neck (KEYNOTE-048): a randomized, open-label, phase 3 study." She serves as the co-leader of the Developmental Therapeutics Research Program at Yale Cancer Center; she is Director of the Yale Head and Neck Specialized Program in Research Excellence, awarded by the National Institutes of Health in 2020.

In 2021, she was appointed Interim Associate Director for Diversity, Equity, and Inclusion at the Yale Cancer Center.  Burtness co-leads the multi-institutional Stand Up to Cancer Fanconi Anemia Research Fund-Farrah Fawcett Foundation Head and Neck Cancer Research Team. In 2023, she was appointed Chief Translational Research Officer and Associate Director for Translational Research at Yale Cancer Center . Burtness chairs the ECOG-ACRIN Cancer Research Group Head and Neck Therapeutics Committee and the ECOG-ACRIN Task Force on Advancement of Women.

References

Living people
American oncologists
American internists
20th-century American women physicians
20th-century American physicians
21st-century American women physicians
21st-century American physicians
Date of birth missing (living people)
Place of birth missing (living people)
Yale University faculty
Bryn Mawr College alumni
Stony Brook University alumni
Year of birth missing (living people)
Women oncologists
Women internists